The PFL 10 mixed martial arts event for the 2018 season of the Professional Fighters League was held on October 20, 2018, at the St. Elizabeths East Entertainment and Sports Arena in Washington, D.C.

Background
The event was the tenth of the 2018 season and marked the start of the playoffs for the Middleweight and Welterweight divisions.

On October 15, it was announced that second seed welterweight João Zeferino had to pull out of the tournament with a knee injury. He was replaced with Abubakar Nurmagomedov.

Results

2018 PFL Middleweight playoffs

2018 PFL Welterweight playoffs

See also
List of PFL events
List of current PFL fighters

References

Professional Fighters League
2018 in mixed martial arts
Mixed martial arts in Washington, D.C.
2018 in sports in Washington, D.C.
October 2018 sports events in the United States
Events in Washington, D.C.